Jai Krishan Sharma (11 February 1943 – 10 September 2019)  was an Indian teacher, agriculturist and politician belonging to Bharatiya Janata Party.  He was elected as a member of Himachal Pradesh Legislative Assembly from Santokhgarh in 1998. He served as President of Himachal Pradesh Bharatiya Janata Party from 2000 to 2003. He died on 10 September 2019.

References

1943 births
2019 deaths
Bharatiya Janata Party politicians from Himachal Pradesh
Himachal Pradesh MLAs 1998–2003
Indian schoolteachers